Amroha murder case refers to an April 2008 familicide in State of Uttar Pradesh by Shabnam and her lover Saleem, who murdered seven members of Shabnam's family by sedating six of them and then hacking them to death; the seventh victim, a ten-month-old baby was murdered unsedated.

Hanging 
Media reports in February 2021 stated that Shabnam is likely to be the first woman to be hanged in independent India. The Governor of Uttar Pradesh as well as the President of India rejected Shabnam's mercy petition. Now her 12-year-old son Muhmmed Taj has requested the President of India to cancel her punishment.

Victims

References 

Familicides
Family murders